Hell on Wheels is an American/Canadian Western television series about the construction of the first transcontinental railroad across the United States, which broadcast in the United States and Canada on the cable channel AMC, from November 6, 2011 to July 23, 2016. The series, which features Anson Mount, Colm Meaney, Common, and Dominique McElligott, chronicles the Union Pacific Railroad and its laborers, mercenaries, prostitutes, surveyors, and others who lived, worked, and died in the mobile encampment, called "Hell on Wheels", that followed the railhead west across the Great Plains.

In particular, the story focuses on Cullen Bohannon (Mount), a former Confederate soldier who initially joins the railroad to track down Union soldiers who murdered his wife and young son during the American Civil War. In the process he becomes a foreman and eventually chief engineer on the railroad.

The series was created and produced by Joe and Tony Gayton, and developed by Endemol USA, under the stewardship of senior vice-president of scripted programming Jeremy Gold, and it is produced by Entertainment One and Nomadic Pictures. In 2012, AMC announced creators Joe and Tony Gayton were no longer involved in the day-to-day production of the series. On December 12, 2012, AMC announced that writer John Wirth would take over as showrunner for the third season.

Season One (2011–12) began in 1865, shortly after the assassination of Abraham Lincoln, Season Two (2012) covered 1866, Seasons Three (2013) and Four (2014) opened in 1867, Season Five (2015–16) carried the series into 1869.

Cast

Main cast

 Anson Mount as Cullen Bohannon, a former Confederate cavalry Colonel who is determined to avenge the murders of his wife, Mary, and his son. Bohannon later leaves revenge in the past and becomes a "railroad man", acting as the foreman for the Transcontinental Railroad.
 Colm Meaney as Thomas "Doc" Durant, a businessman and investor in the First Transcontinental Railroad, who will stop at nothing to make his fortune.
 Common as Elam Ferguson, a recently freed slave who is trying to find his place in the world. He works as security and general assistant to Bohannon. (season 1–4)
 Dominique McElligott as Lily Bell, a recent widow who attempts to establish a position for herself with the railroad. Her husband was a surveyor for the Transcontinental Railroad. (seasons 1–2) 
 Tom Noonan as Reverend Nathaniel Cole, a minister who formerly participated in Bleeding Kansas prior to the Civil War; he is sick of the slaughter and wants to help the whites and Indians avoid another war. (seasons 1–2; guest season 4)
 Eddie Spears as Joseph Black Moon, a Cheyenne Christian convert who must choose between the new world and the traditions of his ancestors. (seasons 1–2)
 Ben Esler as Seán McGinnes, an ambitious young Irishman looking to make his fortune in the West. (seasons 1–3)
 Phil Burke as Michael "Mickey" McGinnes, Sean's older brother, who has travelled with him to America seeking glory.
 Christopher Heyerdahl as Thor Gundersen, Durant's ruthless head of security, also known as "The Swede", even though he is Norwegian (Norway was in a personal union with Sweden at the time of the show's setting). (seasons 2–5; recurring season 1)
 Robin McLeavy as Eva, a woman with a prominent chin-tattoo given to her while in the captivity of Indians. She initially supports herself by working in the Hell on Wheels brothel whilst supporting those in need. (seasons 2–5; recurring season 1)
 Kasha Kropinski as Ruth Cole, Reverend Cole's estranged daughter and the heir to his church. (seasons 3–4; recurring season 2; guest season 1)
 Dohn Norwood as Psalms Jackson, a former slave and criminal, whose prison sentence has been purchased by the railroad. (seasons 3–5; recurring seasons 1–2)
 Jennifer Ferrin as Louise Ellison, a smart, witty and flirtatious journalist hired by the New York Tribune to cover the "story of the century". (seasons 3–5)
 MacKenzie Porter as Naomi Hatch, Aaron Hatch's daughter and Cullen's second wife. (seasons 4–5)
 Siobhan Williams portrayed Naomi in a guest role in the third season.
 Jake Weber as John Allen Campbell, the first governor of the territory of Wyoming who attempts to establish order in Cheyenne. (season 4; recurring season 5)
 Tim Guinee as Collis Huntington, an investor in the Central Pacific Railroad. (season 5; recurring seasons 3–4)
 Reg Rogers as James Strobridge, the superintendent for the Central Pacific Railroad. (season 5)
 Byron Mann as Chang, the main supplier for the Chinese workers who also runs the opium dens and brothels. (season 5)
 Angela Zhou as Mei/ Fong, a Chinese railroad worker for the Central Pacific Railroad with a secret to hide. (season 5)
 Chelah Horsdal as Maggie Palmer, a prominent businesswoman in Cheyenne and an investor in the Union Pacific Railroad. (season 5; recurring seasons 3–4)

Cast Table
  = Main cast (credited) 
  = Recurring cast (3+)
  = Guest cast (1-2)

Recurring cast
 April Telek as Nell, the madam of the Hell on Wheels brothel. (seasons 1–2)
 Duncan Ollerenshaw as Gregory Toole, an Irish laborer on the railroad; antagonist to Elam. (seasons 1–2)
 Chris Ippolito as a young engineer. (seasons 1–2)
 Ian Tracey as Bolan. (season 1)
 James D. Hopkin as Senator Jordan Crane, both ally and antagonist to Durant. (season 1)
 Diego Diablo Del Mar as Dix, a member of Thor Gundersen's security force. (season 1)
 Wes Studi as Chief Many Horses, Joseph's father. (season 1)
 Gerald Auger as Pawnee Killer, Chief Many Horses' son and Joseph's brother. (season 1)
 James Dugan as Carl the Bartender. (seasons 1–2)
 Grainger Hines as Doc Whitehead, a southerner and father figure to Cullen, who knew him before the war. (seasons 2–3)
 Virginia Madsen as Mrs. Hannah Durant, Thomas' headstrong wife. (season 2)
 James Shanklin as Aaron Hatch, Mormon, father to Naomi and father-in-law to Cullen Bohannon. (seasons 3–5)
 Kevin Davey as Paddy Quinn, a Union Pacific Railroad walking boss from Ireland. (seasons 3–5)
 Haysam Kadri as Dutch Dufray, a worker on the Union Pacific Railroad. (seasons 3–5)
 Leon Ingulsrud as Major Augustus Bendix. (seasons 3–5)
 Tayden Marks as Ezra Dutson, a young Mormon boy who is traveling across the prairie with his parents. (seasons 3–4)
 Serge Houde as Congressman Oakes Ames. (season 3)
 Damian O'Hare as Declan Toole, Gregory's brother. (season 3)
 David Wilson Barnes as Martin Delaney, chief engineer. (seasons 4–5)
 Gregg Henry as Brigham Young, leader of the Mormons and President of the Church of Jesus Christ of Latter-day Saints. (seasons 4–5)
 Andrew Howard as Dandy Johnny Shea, Mickey's cousin. (seasons 4–5)
 Kevin Blatch as Judge Webber. (seasons 4–5)
 Jonathan Scarfe as Sydney Snow, former Confederate soldier. (season 4)
 Christian Sloan as Parker (season 4)
 Billy Wickman as Heckard,  a member of John Campbell's entourage. (season 4)
 Peter Benson as Marshal Jessup. (season 4)
 Gia Crovatin as Mrs. Delaney. (season 4)
 Amber Chardae Robinson as Mary Fields, stagecoach driver. (season 5)
 Josh Caras as Phineas Young, Brigham's son. (season 5)
 Tzi Ma as Tao, head of the Chinese crew for the Central Pacific Railroad and Fong/Mei's father. (season 5)

Cast Table
  = Recurring cast (3+)
  = Guest cast (1-2)

Notable Guest cast
 Ted Levine as Daniel Johnson, Cullen's predecessor as foreman of the Union Pacific Railroad. (season 1)
 Robert Moloney as Robert Bell, Lily's husband. (season 1)
 Kassia Warshawski as Mary Bohannon, Cullen's deceased wife. (season 1)
 Ryan Robbins as Hawkins, leader of a gang of ex-Confederate train robbers. (season 2)
 Victor Slezak as Ulysses S. Grant. (seasons 3–5)

Series overview

Season One (2011–12)

In 1865, former Confederate soldier Cullen Bohannon (Anson Mount) journeys to the Union Pacific Railroad's westward construction of the First Transcontinental Railroad, seeking both work and vengeance on the Union soldiers who killed his wife and son. Cullen gets hired by the railroad and supervises an all-black "cut crew", including Elam (Common), whose job is to prepare the terrain for track laying. Through conversation with the railroad foreman, Daniel Johnson (Ted Levine), Cullen learns more about his wife's death,  but tragedy strikes before Johnson reveals her killer's name. Thomas "Doc" Durant (Colm Meaney) begins his "mad, noble quest" to expand his Union Pacific westward, in order to complete the transcontinental railroad. Lily Bell (Dominique McElligott) accompanies her ailing husband, Robert (Robert Moloney), as he surveys the landscape for the Union Pacific; when Robert is killed by the Cheyenne natives, Lily must cope with being a widow on foreign soil. Reverend Nathaniel Cole (Tom Noonan) baptizes Joseph Black Moon (Eddie Spears), a Cheyenne, then takes him under his tutelage in the church. Season one ends with Bohannon killing a man he believes was responsible for the rape and murder of his wife, only to discover that man was not there at the time.

Season Two (2012)

Bohannon tries to find himself again while continuing to drive the westward expansion of the Union Pacific Railroad, under Durant's leadership. Bohannon takes up with a gang of train robbers but is turned over to the Union Army and imprisoned. Durant manages to get him pardoned. The railroad construction enters the Sioux territory, where The Swede and a misguided Reverend Cole assist the natives in attacking the railroad. Lily Bell seeks to gain control of the railroad from Durant and mails his accounting ledgers to the government. Army officers arrive to find the town has been attacked by the Sioux.

Season Three (2013)

Bohannon abandons his quest to avenge his wife and son's deaths, in order to battle Durant for control of the Union Pacific Railroad. Eva gives birth to a baby who was sired during her marriage to Gregory Toole. Elam proposes marriage to her, even though her post-partum depression weighs heavily on her. The Swede takes up with a Mormon family on their way to the fictional Fort Smith and later reveals his true nature.

Season Four (2014)

Conflict arises among the government and businesses, ranchers, homesteaders, and the railroad as all of those interests compete with one another for control of Cheyenne, Wyoming, the most important railroad hub in 1867. Meanwhile, the Union Pacific Railroad continues its expansion westward, and Bohannon adjusts to being a husband and father again.

Season Five (2015–16)

In Season 5, set in California and Laramie, Wyoming, Bohannon is hired by the Central Pacific Railroad to build the transcontinental railroad eastward over the Sierra Nevada Mountains. He befriends its Chinese workers, including Mei, a woman disguised as a man known as Fong. President Ulysses S. Grant increases the competition between the Central Pacific and Union Pacific Railroad companies. This is further complicated by Thomas Durant's corruption.

Episodes

Production

Development history
Hell on Wheels was created by Joe and Tony Gayton in late 2008, and Endemol USA's scripted television division, headed by senior vice president of original programming Jeremy Gold, came on board to develop the series for AMC. On May 18, 2010, AMC placed a pilot order for Hell on Wheels with Endemol USA. Joe and Tony Gayton wrote the pilot, David Von Ancken was attached to the project as director, and Jeremy Gold, Joe Gayton, and Tony Gayton served as executive producers. On July 6, 2010, Endemol USA announced that they had entered into a partnership with Entertainment One, which would serve as the production studio on the project.

Part of the deal between the two companies included provisions of international distribution, with Endemol retaining rights to the series across Europe, while Entertainment One acquired rights to Hell on Wheels in all remaining territories. As a result of the deal, Entertainment One also holds global rights for DVD and Blu-ray sales, as well as video-on-demand and other digital distribution services. The Canadian production company Nomadic Pictures was brought onto the project to serve as co-producers alongside Entertainment One. The pilot was delivered to AMC executives in November 2010.

On November 12, 2010 it was reported by Deadline that the executives at AMC were impressed with the pilot, and, coupled with the fact that the network had just cancelled their drama series, Rubicon, were likely to order Hell on Wheels to series.

On December 15, 2010, AMC green-lighted the series with an order of 10 episodes. Along with the series pickup, AMC announced that Nomadic Pictures would again co-produce the series, as they had done for the pilot, with Mike Frislev and Chad Oakes joining the series as producers, while John Shiban and David Von Ancken joined the series as executive producers; Von Ancken had previously served as director on the pilot. The network also announced that John Morayniss and Michael Rosenberg would oversee production for Entertainment One, while Joel Stillerman and Susie Fitzgerald would oversee production for AMC.

On July 28, 2011, AMC announced that Hell on Wheels would premiere on November 6, 2011. The series is produced by Entertainment One and Nomadic Pictures.

On November 8, 2011, co-creator Joe Gayton spoke of the series' origins: "We [Tony and I] started talking and remembered this story, American Experience, which was this really great documentary, and I thought, 'God, that’s great. I just learned a bunch of stuff I had never learned before.' You just have this cursory information that the Chinese and the Irish built the railroad, but it got in underneath all the dirt and stuff that went on, with the financing of it, and the greed and corruption. And then, I heard about this Hell on Wheels place and I went, 'What a great setting for a western.' So, we pitched that to Jeremy Gold [at Endemol] and ended up taking it to AMC, and they loved it," he said.

On October 29, 2012, AMC renewed Hell on Wheels for a third season, however it was also announced that the series creators and showrunners, Joe and Tony Gayton, "will no longer be involved day-to-day on the show" and series producer/writer/director John Shiban would take over. Following the departure of Shiban, the renewal was put on hold until a replacement could be found. On December 12, 2012, AMC announced that John Wirth, a writer for Terminator: The Sarah Connor Chronicles, would be the new showrunner, starting with the show's third season.

Casting

Casting announcements began in July 2010, with Common first to be cast. Common portrays Elam Ferguson, "an emancipated slave who is working to achieve true freedom in a world entrenched in prejudice".
Next to join the series were Anson Mount and Dominique McElligott, with Mount playing Cullen Bohannon, "a former soldier hell bent on avenging his wife’s death", and McElligott playing Lily Bell, "a newly widowed woman trying to survive in a man’s world".
Colm Meaney was next to be cast as Thomas "Doc" Durant, a "greedy entrepreneur taking full advantage of the changing times".
Ben Esler, Phil Burke and Eddie Spears were the last actors to be cast, with Esler playing Seán McGinnes and Burke playing Mickey McGinnes, "two young brothers looking to find their fortune in the new West".  Spears was cast as Joseph Black Moon, "a Native American man torn between his culture and the changing world around him".
It was later announced that Jesse Lipscombe, Gerald Auger, Robert Moloney and Ted Levine had joined the series as recurring guest stars.

Jennifer Ferrin joined the cast as a series regular for season three, playing a New York Sun journalist covering the construction of the railroad.
AMC announced that Dohn Norwood (Psalms) became a series regular for season three.

Jake Weber joined the fourth season's cast. He was initially to portray a carpetbagger seeking to profit from the frontier, but his role changed to John Allen Campbell, first governor of Wyoming. MacKenzie Porter has also been cast. She will replace Siobhan Williams in the role of Naomi, Bohannon's Mormon bride.

Cast quotes
 

Common spoke about the challenges of playing a former slave: "Very challenging. And that's why I took it on. It's a lot of responsibility because what black people went through in slavery, within that system of slavery, was really treacherous. And for me, I felt like I owed it to the people that lived during that time to bring something truthful to the character. And even just revisiting some of the experiences of it, [there] was just a lot of emotion and a lot of pain. At the same time, a lot of strength came from it. What I enjoy most about the character is the fact that he was written so strong, not as just a person that was oppressed and kept his head down."

Canadian actor Christopher Heyerdahl talks about how he got his role and the rarity of a Scandinavian character: "Well, luck and providence, I suppose. They say, 'What’s luck? Preparation and opportunity.' So, I guess the opportunity came, in the form of an audition. I put myself on tape, and they responded to it. I went in and did a call-back audition, and they felt that we were on the same track. My idea of who The Swede was, was the same as theirs, and vice versa. This kind of character is very rare, with the fact that it fit so well with my background and my understanding of a Norwegian man. It all just fell into place. I still get a little choked up thinking about how often a character like this comes along. For the viewer, it’s quite interesting. It’s not a character that we see very often, and certainly not in this form. As an actor, it seemed to be tailor-made for me. It’s quite wonderful."

Irish actress Dominique McElligott never expected to be cast in a period American role: "I was hanging out in London, having drinks with friends who are all flight attendants, and they said that they would get me over to America for free, and I could stay and do some meetings and auditions. Hell on Wheels was the first one. I arrived on the 5th of July, and the Hell on Wheels audition was on the 6th or the 7th. It was crazy! They didn’t know me, at all. Obviously, I loved the pilot and I loved the character, but I didn’t anticipate ever actually getting the chance to do it. When you go up for these brilliant parts, you just figure, 'Okay, well, they’re going to pick some American actress, and that will be that.' But, the opportunity was there, and I really enjoyed the audition. It was fun."

Exterior filming
Filming of the first season took place in Calgary, as well as areas in central and southern Alberta. The T'suu T'ina Native Indian Reservation, an Indian reserve in southern Alberta, was the location for most of the exteriors.

Exterior filming of the second season was near the Bow River in Calgary. Interior filming was in a building near the city's airport. Series producers expected the filming of the season's ten episodes to take about 80 days.

Filming of the third season was suspended part way through the sixth episode when the location was included in the mandatory evacuation area due to the flooding in southern Alberta.  Originally, producers had announced a two-day shut down, when the only road to the location was underwater. Later, on June 21, producers announced that the production hiatus, scheduled to begin June 27, would take effect immediately. Anson Mount shared pictures of the nearby river and exterior sets flooding on June 20 and 21.

Filming of the fourth season's 13 episodes took place along the Bow River. Filming occurred from April 24 to September 24, 2014.

The fifth season's production filming occurred on the CL Ranch, west of Calgary, for the Truckee, California, and Laramie, Wyoming, locations. The Kananaskis Country park system, 40 miles west of the ranch, served as the Sierra Nevada mountains the Central Pacific must cross.

Reception

Critical response

The first season was given 63% on Metacritic based on 28 reviews, indicating a "generally favorable" impression.
The second season was given 60% on Metacritic, indicating "mixed or average"  reviews.
The Washington Post Hank Stuever rated the show highly, commenting, "Hands down, the most intriguing show on the fall slate. Though imbued with epic sweep, Hell on Wheels is a western at heart, even if that heart is cold. Plenty of guns, knives, arrows, scalpings – mixed with the incendiary socio-psychological wounds left in the Civil War’s wake."

Robert Lloyd of the Los Angeles Times says the show "...takes its cues more from the movies than from life. Never, in the episodes I watched, did I feel as if I were actually seeing how a railroad got built, and sometimes it took a bit of squinting not to see the characters as actors in a field, reading lines. Still, for all the unlikely things [the creators] make happen in order to get their characters into place, and the dogged refusal of a couple of those characters to become interesting at all, the show gathers steam as it goes on."

The Wall Street Journal Nancy Dewolf Smith comments: " 'Hell on Wheels' finds enough beauty, danger and emotion to make some part of every episode seem fresh and worth waiting for. Not that new is always a good thing. Despite striking performances even in many of the smaller roles, the actors sometimes are made to symbolize very modern obsessions, e.g. with race and gender. The sight of modern sensibilities lurking behind the curtains can break ye olde spell."

Brian Lowry of Variety writes: "While the diverse mix of characters could work to the program's advantage over the long haul, jumping to and fro among them creates a diluted, herky-jerky ride in the early going."

The Washington Post reported that the series has been criticized for not depicting Chinese immigrants during the transcontinental railroad construction scenes. Creator Joe Gayton said "budget-wise and time-wise... we could really only concentrate on one side of [the railroad building], and that's probably why we, you know, that's why we chose the [emanating from the East Coast] Union Pacific as opposed to the [emanating from the West Coast] Central Pacific."<ref name="gayton">{{cite news |url= https://www.washingtonpost.com/lifestyle/style/tv-column/2011/07/28/gIQA2FczfI_story.html |title= TV Column: AMC at a loss for words over 'The Killing,Hell on Wheels' |date= July 28, 2011 |last= de Moraes |first= Lisa |newspaper= The Washington Post |access-date= December 5, 2011 |archive-date= October 17, 2011 |archive-url= https://web.archive.org/web/20111017065256/http://www.washingtonpost.com/lifestyle/style/tv-column/2011/07/28/gIQA2FczfI_story.html |url-status= live }}</ref> By the fifth season, the show expanded its focus to include a significant look at the role of Chinese immigrant workers in the growth of the railroad.

Ratings

The pilot, premiering November 6. 2011, was watched by 4.4 million viewers – AMC's second-highest series premiere in history, following The Walking Dead. Among key demographics, the pilot episode was viewed by 2.4 million viewers in the adults 18–49 category, and 2.3 million viewers in the adults 25–54 demographics, according to Nielsen. The total viewership bested network slot rivals CSI: Miami and Pan Am. The sixth episode was watched by 2.15 million viewers, the lowest viewership of the first season and had a 0.6 rating in the 18–49 age range. The viewership numbers eventually rebounded with the season one finale being watched by 2.84 million viewers, maintaining its steady 0.7 rating in the 18–49 age range.
In January 2012, following the season one finale, AMC confirmed Hell on Wheels as the network's second-highest rated original series, behind The Walking Dead, averaging three million viewers per episode.

Awards and nominations

International distribution

The series is shown in Australia on FX Australia and in Ireland on RTÉ.

Home media
All five seasons of Hell on Wheels'' have been released in DVD and Blu-ray formats. The complete series was also released in DVD and Blu-ray formats on November 1, 2016, comprising 17 discs. As of June 2019, it is available in the United States on Netflix's online streaming service but is scheduled to be removed at the end of 2020.

References

External links

 
 Production website  of Nomadic Pictures
 Production website of E One TV
 
 
 

 
2010s American drama television series
2011 American television series debuts
2016 American television series endings
AMC (TV channel) original programming
English-language television shows
Serial drama television series
Television series by Entertainment One
Television series by Endemol
Television shows filmed in Calgary
Television series set in the 1860s
2010s Western (genre) television series
Cultural depictions of Brigham Young
Cultural depictions of Ulysses S. Grant
Television series about rail transport